Verticordia endlicheriana is a flowering plant in the myrtle family, Myrtaceae and is endemic to the south-west of Western Australia. It is a shrub with narrow leaves and yellow flowers which in some varieties age to red.  It is a variable species and in his 1991 paper, Alex George formally described five varieties.

Description

Flowering time differs, depending on the variety.

Taxonomy and naming
Verticordia endlicheriana was first formally described by Johannes Conrad Schauer in 1844 and the description was published in Lehmann's Plantae Preissianae. The type specimen was collected by Ludwig Preiss near Cape Riche. The specific epithet (endlicheriana) honours the botanist Stephan Endlicher.

Alex George undertook a review of the genus Verticordia in 1991 and described five varieties of this species:
 Verticordia endlicheriana var. compacta A.S.George which is similar to var. endlicheriana but the flowers are scented and do not turn red as they age;
 Verticordia endlicheriana var. manicula  A.S.George  which is similar to var. compacta except in its growth habit - it is a much more open shrub.

George placed this species in subgenus Chrysoma, section Chrysoma along with V. citrella, V. subulata and V. acerosa.

Distribution and habitat
This verticordia occurs in a wide range of soils and vegetation associations in the south-west of Western Australia, with each variety having slightly differing requirements.

Conservation
Variety angustifolia is classified as "Priority Three" meaning that it is poorly known and known from only a few locations but is not under imminent threat. The four other varieties are classified as "not threatened".

Use in horticulture
The varieties endlicheriana and angustifolia are well established in gardens but the other varieties have been difficult to propagate and maintain in cultivation.

References

endlicheriana
Rosids of Western Australia
Eudicots of Western Australia
Plants described in 1844